Oh Jae-moo (born November 11, 1998) is a South Korean actor.

Filmography

Television series

Film

Awards and nominations

References

External links
 Oh Jae-moo Fan Cafe at Daum 
 
 
 

1998 births
IHQ (company) artists
Living people
South Korean male film actors
South Korean male television actors
South Korean male child actors